North York Centre is a subway station on Line 1 Yonge–University of the Toronto subway system. The station is located under Yonge Street, where it is intersected by Park Home Avenue and Empress Avenue. The station, the system's first and only infill station, opened in 1987 to serve North York City Centre, a high density business district in the Willowdale neighbourhood. Wi-Fi service is available at this station.

History
North York Centre opened in 1987 in what was then the City of North York as an infill station of the Yonge–University line.

This station was added by excavating alongside the existing tracks, on a level section of route provided for this purpose when the line was built. The view across the tracks between platforms is not as open as most stations, as the solid concrete wall had to retain its load-bearing strength, and smaller openings were cut.

In late 2007 the TTC began work to make the station accessible to those with limited mobility, and in November 2009 the work was completed. Two elevators were installed to take passengers from mezzanine level to the subway platforms. Persons in wheelchairs or with other mobility restrictions are now able to enter from street level by way of existing facilities in the major buildings on both sides of the station.

Public art
Artwork in the station consists of North York Heritage Murals by North York artists Nicholas and Susana Graven, located at the platform level. The two murals, each made of over 5000 pieces of glazed ceramic tiles using a process invented by Artessa Studios of North York, depict scenes of North York in the 19th century in an abstract way and are titled:
Top of the North Hill—1850s on the northbound platform (surtitled with the historic place names "Don Mills, Flynntown, L'Amoreaux, Lansing, Milneford, Newtonbrook, Oriole, O'Sullivan's Corners, Willowdale"), and
Traffic at Yonge and Sheppard—1860s on the southbound platform (surtitled with the historic place names "Downsview, Dublin, Eglinton, Elia, Emery, Fairbank, Fisherville, Humber Summit, Kaiserville, York Mills, Weston").
The historic place names shown above each of the murals are names of historic communities near an imaginary line from the northwest to the southeast through the historic Lansing.

Nearby landmarks 

Direct underground level connection from the station are: on the east side with the Empress Walk shopping, entertainment and residential complex; and on the west side with City Centre, which includes commercial office and retail space as well as a cluster of City of Toronto facilities that include Mel Lastman Square, North York Civic Centre, North York Central Library and Douglas Snow Aquatic Centre. Other nearby landmarks include Earl Haig Secondary School, Gibson House, Meridian Arts Centre and York Cemetery.

Surface connections 

TTC routes serving the station include:

References

External links

Transit Toronto—North York Centre Station has a detailed history and photos of the station

Line 1 Yonge–University stations
Railway stations in Canada opened in 1987
1987 establishments in Ontario
North York